Connetquot River State Park Preserve is a  state park and conservation area in the Town of Islip in Suffolk County, New York in the United States. The park contains the Long Island Environmental Interpretive Center as well as the Southside Sportsmens Club District, which was listed on the National Register of Historic Places in 1973.

Park facilities
The park offers hiking, fishing, a bridle path, nature trails, cross-country skiing, snow shoeing, a museum, and recreation activities. It also contains the site of the Southside Sportsmens Club District, which has been on the National Register of Historic Places since 1973.

The park is home to the Long Island Environmental Interpretive Center, which provides educational programs year-round. The center hosts the Regional Environmental Education Team, which assists schools, youth groups, and other organizations by leading interpretation activities within the region's state parks.

Vehicles are charged an entrance fee, however pedestrians may enter for free through several gates along the park's perimeter. A permit is required for horseback riding within the park. The park is a carry-in carry-out facility, as there are no garbage bins along the trails. Additionally there are no picnic facilities or play areas for children. Anglers possessing proper permits may fish for brook, brown, and rainbow trout within the park.

See also
 Connetquot River
 List of New York state parks

References

External links
 
 New York State Parks: Connetquot River State Park Preserve
 New York State Parks: Long Island Environmental Interpretive Center
 Friends of Connetquot

State parks of New York (state)
Islip (town), New York
Robert Moses projects
Historic districts on the National Register of Historic Places in New York (state)
Parks on the National Register of Historic Places in New York (state)
Parks in Suffolk County, New York
Clubhouses in New York (state)
Men's club buildings
Nature centers in New York (state)
National Register of Historic Places in Suffolk County, New York